is a Japanese diplomat and former Ambassador to Thailand.

He studied law at the Kyoto University.

He entered the Japanese Ministry of Foreign Affairs in 1969. From 1981 to 1984 he served as First Secretary of the Japanese Embassy in the United States. From 1984 to 1987 he served as Councillor of the Japanese Embassy in the Soviet Union. From 1994 to 1996 he served as the Japanese Consul-General in London. From 2004 to 2007 he served as the Japanese Ambassador to the Netherlands. In 2008 became the Japanese Ambassador to Thailand.

External links
 Professional CV
 Speech delivered by Ambassador Komachi on Japanese-Thai relations

1946 births
Living people
Ambassadors of Japan to Thailand
Ambassadors of Japan to the Netherlands
Kyoto University alumni